Conophis morai, Mora's road guarder, is a species of snake in the family Colubridae. The species is native to Mexico.

References

Conophis
Snakes of North America
Reptiles described in 2002
Endemic reptiles of Mexico
Endemic fauna of Los Tuxtlas